Unconquered Bandit is a 1935 American Western film directed by Harry S. Webb and starring Tom Tyler, Lillian Gilmore and Slim Whitaker. The film is a remake of Dynamite Ranch (1932),

Main cast
 Tom Tyler as Tom Morgan  
 Lillian Gilmore as Helen Cleyburn  
 Slim Whitaker as Jose Porfirio aka The Night Hawk 
 William Gould as Frank Cleyburn  
 John Elliott as Mr. Morgan, Tom's Father  
 Earl Dwire as  Pedro Gonzales  
 Joe De La Cruz as Gasparo De Gama 
 George Chesebro as Cleyburn Henchman Dick  
 Lew Meehan as Cleyburn Henchman  
 Richard Alexander as Night Hawk Henchman Pat 
 George Hazel as Night Hawk Henchman Alonzo

References

Bibliography
 Pitts, Michael R. Poverty Row Studios, 1929–1940: An Illustrated History of 55 Independent Film Companies, with a Filmography for Each. McFarland & Company, 2005.

External links
 

1935 films
1935 Western (genre) films
1930s English-language films
American Western (genre) films
Films directed by Harry S. Webb
Reliable Pictures films
American black-and-white films
1930s American films